An emergency operations center (EOC) is a central command and control facility responsible for carrying out the principles of emergency preparedness, emergency management, and disaster management functions at a strategic level during an emergency, and ensuring the continuation of operation of a company, political subdivision, or other organization.

An EOC is responsible for strategic direction and operational decisions and does not normally directly control field assets, instead leaving tactical decisions to lower commands. The common functions of EOCs is to collect, gather and analyze data; make decisions that protect life and property, maintain continuity of the organization, within the scope of applicable laws; and disseminate those decisions to all concerned agencies and individuals.

When an EOC is operated in a vehicle such as a truck or trailer, or is otherwise capable of moving quickly (or being operated while moving), it is usually called a mobile command center (MCC).

Location 
EOCs, originally created as part of United States civil defense, can be found in many nations, at all government levels, as well as in larger corporations that deal with large equipment or numbers of employees. In corporations and smaller jurisdictions, the EOC may be co-located in the same room as an emergency communications center.

Organization 
The first most critical component of an EOC is the individuals who staff it.  They must be properly trained, and have the proper authority to carry out actions that are necessary to respond to the disaster.  They also must be capable of thinking outside the box, and creating a lot of "what if" scenarios. The local EOC's function during an emergency is to support the incident commander.

The second most critical component of an EOC is its communications system.  This can be from simple word of mouth, to sophisticated encrypted communications networks, but it must provide for a redundant path to ensure that both situational awareness information and strategic orders can pass into and out of the facility without interruption.  For continuity of operations considerations, backbone components of the communications system are not normally located at the EOC. A number of EOC facilities are incorporating radio over IP technology to provide a coherent assembly of various radios, interoperability with various radio technologies, and integration with telephone systems.

See also 
Emergency management
Tactical operations center

References

External links 
CDC Emergency Operations Center

Emergency services
Disaster preparedness
Continuity of government